The 2004 international cricket season was from April to September 2004.

Season overview

Pre-season rankings

April

Sri Lanka in Zimbabwe

May

Bangladesh in the West Indies

New Zealand in England

Australia in Zimbabwe

June

NatWest Series

July

Sri Lanka in Australia

Asia Cup

Group stage

Super Fours

West Indies in England

August

South Africa in Sri Lanka

Videocon Cup

September

India in England

Australia vs Pakistan in England

ICC Champions Trophy

References

External links
2004 season on ESPN Cricinfo

2004 in cricket